The following is a list of Wyoming-based breweries. As of August 2022, Wyoming had 40 active microbreweries. In 2011–2012, craft beer production in Wyoming increased over 32%. In April 2014, The Wyoming Craft Brewers Guild was established by various Wyoming brewers.

Breweries

Closed breweries

See also
 List of microbreweries

References

External links
 Wyoming Craft Brewers Guild

Wyoming
Breweries